Richard Cornell (1625–1693) was an English Quaker ironmaster and resident of Long Island. He is generally considered the first European settler on the Rockaway Peninsula in the present-day Borough of Queens, New York City. Cornell purchased the Rockaway land from another Englishman, Captain John Palmer, in 1687, and settled there in 1690. His grandfather was Thomas Cornell.

Cornell owned much land in Rockaway, much of which was partitioned into 46 parcels in 1820, which were eventually sold to outsiders, property was still being sold even in the late 19th century, as for example the sale of the land comprising the present-day neighborhood of Bayswater to William Trist Bailey in 1878.

The homestead of the Cornells by the beachfront later the site of the Marine Pavilion.

The Cornell Family Cemetery on Gateway Boulevard in Far Rockaway has been designated as a New York City Landmark.

Descendants 
Whitny Braun, American Bioethicist.

References

External links
 http://www.rent-direct.com/Queens_Apartments/apartments-queens-rkwy.html
 http://www.nycgovparks.org/sub_your_park/historical_signs/hs_historical_sign.php?id=12915

Cornell family
Land owners and developers in Rockaway, Queens
English ironmasters
Year of death unknown
Year of birth unknown
English Quakers
People from Flushing, Queens
People of the Province of New York
1693 deaths
1625 births
English emigrants